Saint-Éphrem-de-Beauce is a municipality in the Municipalité régionale de comté de Beauce-Sartigan in Quebec, Canada. It is part of the Chaudière-Appalaches region and the population was 2,567 as of the Canadian census of 2011. It was named after Ephrem the Syrian.

Flag origin
It incorporates the same colours as the French flag as a sign of the community's French identity. The three green maple leaves on a white background represent its maple country location, while the number three is for the founding communities of Saint-Isidore, Sainte-Marie and Beauceville. The flag was adopted in 1955.

Economy

Some important industries are there so:

 René Matériaux Composites
 Porte Baillargeon
 Industrie PHL
 Filature Lemieux
 Transport Couture

Administration
1855 : Constitution of the municipalité de canton de Tring
1866 : The municipalité de paroisse de Saint-Éphrem-de-Tring is created during the breakup of Tring.
1870 : Saint-Éphrem-de-Tring changes its status to municipality.
1897 : The municipalité de village de Saint-Éphrem-de-Tring detaches from the municipality.
1956 : The municipality of Saint-Ephrem de Tring changed its name to municipalité de paroisse de Saint-Éphrem-de-Beauce
1997 : Fusion between Saint-Éphrem-de-Tring and Saint-Éphrem-de-Beauce to become the municipalité de Saint-Éphrem-de-Beauce.

See also
Woodstock en Beauce

References

Commission de toponymie du Québec

Incorporated places in Chaudière-Appalaches
Municipalities in Quebec